Douglas Brooke Wheelton Sladen (5 February 1856, London-12 February 1947, Hove) was an English author and academic.

Life
Educated at Temple Grove School, East Sheen, Cheltenham College, and Trinity College, Oxford, in 1879 Sladen migrated to Australia, where he became the first professor of history in the new University of Sydney.  Subsequently he traveled much and settled in London as a writer.  Poems by Margaret Thomas were included in a work in the 1880s.

Selected publications
His work includes:  
 Frithjof and Ingebjorg (1882)
 Poetry of Exiles (1883)
 In Cornwall and Across the Sea (1885)
 Edward the Black Prince (1886), an epic drama
 The Spanish Armada (1888)
 The Japs at Home (1892)
 A Japanese Marriage (1895)
 A Sicilian Marriage (1905)
 Queer Things About Sicily with Norma Lorimer (1905)
 Carthage and Tunis: The Old and New Gates of the Orient (1906)
 Egypt and the English (1908)
 Queer Things About Egypt (1911)
 The Unholy Estate (1912)
 Twenty Years of my Life (1913)
 Queer Things about Japan (1913)
 The Real "Truth about Germany" (1914)
 His German Wife (1915)
 Fair Inez: A Romance of Australia (1918)
 Paul's Wife: or "The Ostriches" (1919)
 My Long Life (1939)

References

External links

 Australian Dictionary of Biography entry
Researching Biography: Who is Douglas Sladen?
 
 
 Twenty Years of my Life (New York: EP Dutton & Company Publishers, 1913), archive.org

Writers from London
English writers
People educated at Temple Grove School
Australian people of English descent
People educated at Cheltenham College
1856 births
1947 deaths
Alumni of Trinity College, Oxford